Standings and results for Group 2 of the UEFA Euro 1984 qualifying tournament.

Group 2 consisted of Finland, Poland, Portugal and USSR. Group winners were Portugal, who finished a point clear of second-placed USSR.

Final table

Results

Goalscorers

References
UEFA Page
RSSSF

Group 2
1982–83 in Polish football
1983–84 in Polish football
1982–83 in Portuguese football
1983–84 in Portuguese football
Portugal at UEFA Euro 1984
1982 in Soviet football
1983 in Soviet football
1982 in Finnish football
1983 in Finnish football